is a Japanese magical girl anime television series produced by Toei Animation. It is the eighteenth installment in the Pretty Cure franchise. It is directed by Yutaka Tsuchida and written by Masahiro Yokotani. The series premiered on ANN on February 28, 2021, succeeding Healin' Good Pretty Cure in its initial time slot. It was succeeded by Delicious Party Pretty Cure on February 6, 2022.

The show's themes are motivation and responsibility, both are which are emphasized in reference to its protagonists creating and forming the Tropical Club, as well as one's ability to take accountability for their actions. While not stated otherwise, another actual theme is dance (the third series after Fresh Pretty Cure! and HappinessCharge PreCure!), as all of its cures excel at several dance styles - even incorporating those moves in their fighting and attacks, and it also contains the series' first dance-focused opening. The cures' main motifs are mermaids, tropical and ocean themes, and cosmetics.

Toei Animation Inc. licensed the series outside Japan with Crunchyroll  streaming the series in several western territories.

Story
Upon her arrival on the mainland, she begins her new life there and her first semester in middle school. But one day, she met with a strange person named Laura, a mermaid who had originated in a mystical place called Grand Ocean, the land of Mermaids. She has been searching for the legendary warriors of the Grand Ocean who can stand up against the Witch of Delays, an entity from the bottom of the ocean that conquered her nation and has sucked all the Motivation Power out of the people in the kingdom. Laura is only searching for the legendary warriors due to the request from the Queen of Mermaids and just for her own selfish desire to be queen one day. But as one of the witch's minions started to attack Aozora City, Manatsu suddenly is blessed with the powers of the sea that allows her to become Cure Summer, one of the legendary warriors foretold in the legends of the Grand Ocean.

Manatsu is later joined by Sango Suzumura (Cure Coral), Minori Ichinose (Cure Papaya), Asuka Takizawa (Cure Flamingo) and Laura (Cure La Mer) to form the Tropical-Rouge Pretty Cure Team to fend off against the forces of the Witch of Delays and restore the Grand Ocean to its former splendor.

Characters

Pretty Cures
 

The main protagonist. Manatsu is an extremely energetic 1st year middle school student who moved from Minamino Island to Aozora City. She always acts before she thinks, and in any situation, Manatsu says "I'll do what's important, right now!" Manatsu's most precious item is the lipstick her mother had given her. She is the balanced leader of the group. Her charm point is her lips. Her theme colors are rainbow and white.

 

Sango is a stylish 1st year middle school student and also Manatsu's classmate. She is very kind, loves cute things and can get along with anyone. Her family owns a beauty parlor named the "Pretty Holic", and she is knowledgeable about makeup and cosmetics. She is the tank of the group focusing more on defensive moves. Her charm point is her cheeks. Her theme color is purple.

 

Minori is an intelligent 2nd year middle school student who loves to read. An honor student with the best grades in the school, she has a poker face, yet struggles to show any emotions. However, she has a strong sense of self-esteem. She has loved the fairytale, The Little Mermaid, since she was a child, and knows a lot of stories about mermaids. As Cure Papaya, she specializes in special attacks. Her charm point is her eyes. Her theme color is yellow.

 

Asuka is an athletic 3rd year middle school student with a strong sense of justice. At first glance, she appears to be cool and unapproachable, however, she is actually very reliable and loves to cook and play cute animal games. As Cure Flamingo, she specializes in close combat capabilities better than the other members. Her charm point is her hair. Her theme color is red.

 

Full name , Laura is a mermaid originating from the Grand Ocean sent to the surface world to search for the Legendary Warriors of the Grand Ocean. She is very self-confident, somewhat selfish, and is the type of person who will honestly say whatever is on her mind. As Cure La Mer, she transforms into a human, gaining legs in the process. Her charm point is her nails. Her theme color is blue.

Grand Ocean
The  is a kingdom where Laura and Kururun came from. It is ruled by the Mermaid Queen.

A seal-like sea fairy from the Grand Ocean and also the Queen's current pet.

Villains

Leaders
 
 
The main antagonist of the series, the Witch of Delay's seahorse-like butler who is often composed. Despite his blind loyalty to the Witch, Butler refuses to accept her choice of befriending Oasis and decides to fill up the Fool's Casket personally by transforming into a Yaraneeda to take the Precures' Motivation power. But Butler is defeated in the epic battle that followed, sacrificing his motivation to complete power the Fool's Casket before its power was drained by La Mer. Butler is reduced to a slothful and catatonic shell of his former self, placed in the care of Chongire, Numeri and Elda to prevent him from trying to destroy the world again.

 
 
The secondary antagonist of the series, a gigantic sea witch with an moray eel's tail who took away the motivation of most of the Grand Ocean's inhabitants. Despite her power, she is very lazy and often passes the task to her followers. She was once known as  who sought the power of the Fool's Casket for immortality and plunging the world into eternal laziness while settling things with Oasis. However, the Witch learned her true intentions was to become Oasis's friend and disappears after accepting the latter's offer of friendship.

Generals
Minions of the Witch of Delays under Butler's leadership. They can throw orbs at objects to create Yaraneedas/Zenzen Yaraneedas/Zettai Yaraneedas/Super Zettai Yaraneedas that steal peoples' Motivation Power leaving them unmotivated and lethargic. Each general rides a boat when they attack Aozora City. All members are based on marine species.

 
A hermit crab-like chef of The Witch of Delays who is not fond of having to steal Motivation Power, but will do it since the witch wants him to do so.

 
A sea cucumber-like doctor of The Witch of Delays who has a laid-back personality. She is also quite sarcastic and enjoys relishing in others’ agony.

 
A shrimp-like maid of The Witch of Delays who dislikes fulfilling responsibilities. She is also short-tempered and bratty.

Monsters

The series' main monsters. They are summoned by the generals by throwing an orb of dark energy at objects to steal Motivation Power from humans. Their name is based on the word "yaranai" (やらない) which means "I don't want to do this".

They are the monsters summoned by Butler during the final battle that were used by the Witch of Delays when she tried to destroy the Earth many years earlier. They are summoned by a dark blue orb and have three long legs and two long, posable arms.

Cures' family members

Manatsu's father.

Manatsu's mother. She works at Aozora aquarium.

Sango's mother. She is the owner of the Pretty Holic beauty parlor.

Minori's mother.

Asuka's father.

Aozora Middle School

 
Manatsu and Sango’s headroom teacher.

 
The school's student council president.

Manatsu and Sango's classmates.

The school's pampered, arrogant disciplinary committee head who hates and does not believe mermaids exist.

, 

The only members of the broadcasting club.

The director of the swimming club.

A student who’s looking to create an Astronomy Club.

The student council vice president who runs for student council president when Yuriko steps down.

Others

The director of the Aozora aquarium.

A famous actress and model, known for her sweet and gentle character. Manatsu and the others help her gain confidence to play the role of the villain in a movie.

A group of ex-students who attended the same middle school as Manatsu and the others many years before. Together they had founded a club of their own and promised to reunite once they finished their studies.

 & 

The two children who attend the Aozora kindergarten. They become friends when both, thanks to Laura, discover they have a common passion for insects.

An old lady from Minamino Island. As per the tradition of the place, he welcomes children to his home to tell them stories and legends that are handed down from generation to generation. Thanks to a legend, which says that a mermaid hid a treasure on the island in a cave, she helps Manatsu and the others find the Perfume Shiny Brace.

,  & 

A group of children from Minamino Island and friends of Manatsu.

A TV presenter who arrived in Aozora to give visibility to the city's middle school. After a confrontation between the Tropical Club and the student council, he decides to resolve the situation via a TV quiz.

  

A legendary cure who appears at Pretty Cure to give them the power of the Tropical Heart Dresser, the Land Heart Kuru Ring and the Marine Heart Kuru Ring to stop the witch.

A famous designer who participates in the Aozora Pretty Collection who recruits Sango as a replacement model for the fashion show of his brand of clothes and accessories.

 

A pink-colored Pretty Cure from Delicious Party Pretty Cure.

The fox-like Energy Fairy of Rice from Delicious Party Pretty Cure.

Movie Characters

The Princess of the Snow Kingdom Chantia and the main antagonist of the Tropical-Rouge! Pretty Cure the Movie: The Snow Princess and the Miraculous Ring!

The Spirits of the Snow Kingdom Chantia

The evil monsters of the Snow Kingdom Chantia

Development
On November 27, 2020, Toei trademarked the name for the new series that will be released for the 2021 season. On December 1, 2020, the series title was officially unveiled on Toei's official website. Toei later revealed the character designs for the main characters as well as both the series' director and writer on December 26, 2020. The series overall motif was a first in the franchise, and the first time its setting was tied to the main character of the series.

Producer Aki Murase spoke on the series' main theme: "What is the most important thing right now?" is a mysterious question that you can't answer well when you grow up. Maybe it's because I learned about tomorrow and learned the technique of postponing it... But how was it when you were a kid? I think that children always have the "invincible motivation power" that no one can take away from the "most important thing" in front of them. Manatsu, the main character of this work, also has "invincible motivation" to decide "the most important thing now" and take action. I want you to find more "the most important things now" through Manatsu, who has a similar feeling as those children, and to support that! I hope that Pretty Cure will lead to children's "I want to try it!", so I incorporated two longing motifs: the sea and cosmetics."

Media

Anime

Tropical-Rouge! Pretty Cure began airing on all ANN stations in Japan on February 28, 2021, succeeding Healin' Good Pretty Cure in its initial time slot. Toei Animation Inc. licensed the series outside Japan with Crunchyroll streaming the series in North America, Australia, New Zealand, South Africa, and Latin America on the same date as the Japanese premiere of the series. A week before the series premiere, Cure Summer appeared in the last episode of Healin’ Good Pretty Cure as a cameo and did a baton pass with Cure Grace at the end of the episode.

Films
A short film, titled , was released on March 20, 2021, along with Healin' Good Pretty Cure the Movie: GoGo! Big Transformation! The Town of Dreams. On October 23, 2021, the film  was released with the cast of HeartCatch PreCure! making an appearance.

Manga
The manga spinoff of the series is written and illustrated by author duo Futago Kamikita and began serialization in Kodansha's  shōjo manga magazine Nakayoshi from March 2021 to February 2022.

Music
Shiho Terada (Garo) returns to compose the music from Healin' Good Pretty Cure.

Openings

Endings

Albums

Merchandise
Like the previous series, Bandai had released several role playing toys based on the main characters' transformation items prior to the series's airing in Japan. Alongside other merchandise, a line of cosmetics and makeup for kids named "Pretty Holic" was released on February 27, 2021.

References

External links
Official website
Official website (Asahi)
 

Pretty Cure
2021 anime television series debuts
TV Asahi original programming
Toei Animation television
Crunchyroll anime
Fictional mermen and mermaids
Magical girl anime and manga
Dance in anime and manga
Mermaids in television
Fiction about amnesia